The 2005 Campeonato Brasileiro Série A (officially the Taça Nestlé Brasileirão 2005 for sponsorship reasons) was the 49th edition of the Campeonato Brasileiro Série A. Corinthians claiming their fourth national title. The season officially kicked off on April 23, 2005 and concluded on December 4.

New teams for 2005

Promoted in 2004
Brasiliense and Fortaleza

Relegated in 2004
Criciúma, Guarani, Vitória, Grêmio

The season

Champion and contenders
Pre-season favorites Corinthians captured their fourth national championship edition despite a turbulent early season and a campaign that went through 3 different head coaches. Key players Carlos Tevez, Carlos Alberto, Roger and Gustavo Nery led the team to a result of 81 points in 42 games. Despite early season turmoil, Corinthians benefited from being one of the few teams in Brazil who could afford to maintain their talent base throughout the season without having to sell key players. The legitimacy of their title was disputed late in the season due to several scandals on and off the field. As 2005 champions, Corinthians received berth into the first round of the Libertadores Cup as well as the South American Cup in 2006.

Internacional of Rio Grande du Sul executed a strong campaign, finishing with a total of 78 points. Coach Muricy Ramalho led a team with Rafael Sobis, Fernandão, and Tinga to the best performance of any team in the second half, narrowly missing the opportunity for their own fourth national title, but also securing a place in the first round of the Libertadores.

Goiás and Palmeiras were awarded pre-Libertadores qualifying matches with teams to be determined by Conmebol for their 3rd (Goiás's best ever) and 4th-place finishes.

Consolation prize
In the top middle of the pack Fluminense, Atlético/PR, Paraná, Cruzeiro, Botafogo, Santos, and São Paulo were awarded allocations in the 2006 Copa Sul-Americana; with São Paulo, who cannot participate due to Libertadores commitments, ceding their spot to 12th placed Vasco da Gama. Santos in particular saw their season nose-dive as star player Robinho was transferred to Real Madrid mid season (a similar fate encountered by Cruzeiro as striker Fred was shipped off to Lyon). Atlético/PR and São Paulo both suffered for having to dedicate their primary attention to the 2005 Libertadores Finals.

The bottom
Finishing in the bottom four and relegated to Série B for 2006 are storied franchise Atlético Mineiro as well as perennial mid-majors Coritiba, Paysandu, and Brasiliense. Série B champions and runner-up Grêmio and Santa Cruz took their place.

New teams for 2006

Promoted in 2005
Grêmio and Santa Cruz

Relegated in 2005
Coritiba, Altético/MG, Paysandu, and Brasiliense

Turmoil on and off the field

The season experienced significant turmoil off the field, marred by a match fixing scandal, which resulted in the replay of 11 série A matches between rounds 31 and 37.

Miscellaneous
At 39 years young, World Cup 1994 hero Romário won the title of leading goal scorer in the league with 22 goals for Vasco da Gama.
2005 noticed a marked impact by foreigners in the Brazilian league. Corinthians contracted 3 Argentine players (with Carlos Tevez becoming the 3rd “gringo” to captain a Brazilian team to the championship) and started the season with Daniel Passarella, of Argentina as coach. Native Serbian Petkovic led Fluminense to a respectable result and won the Silver Ball for the second year in a row as the best midfielder in the Brazilian tournament. 
This season also marked a sponsorship boom for Brazilian football clubs. After the success of Pepsi’s marketing campaign for Corinthians, Korean electronics brand Samsung came on as Corinthians’ shirt sponsor within the season, with Siemens as a secondary sponsor. At the same time, electronic giants Panasonic signed a new sponsorship deal with Santos Futebol Clube, whilst Italian tyre manufacturer Pirelli and Chinese handset maker LG continued their sponsorships with Palmeiras and São Paulo, respectively. Siemens also became a main shirt sponsor for Cruzeiro, whilst also having a contract with Spanish giants Real Madrid.
Bola de Ouro (Golden Ball), awarded by Placar magazine for best overall player of the year: Carlos Tevez of Corinthians.
Bola de Prata (Silver Ball), awarded annually by Placar magazine for best player at each position: Fábio Costa (Corinthians); Cicinho (São Paulo), Lugano (São Paulo), Gamarra (Palmeiras), and Jadílson (Goiás); Mineiro (São Paulo), Marcelo Mattos (Corinthians), Petkovic (Fluminense) and Juninho Paulista (Palmeiras); Tevez (Corinthians) and Rafael Sobis (Internacional).

Statistics

Final standings

Top goal scorers

Mid-season transactions
While the CBF and Clube dos 13 continue to modify the league format in the hopes of decreasing the number of mid-season departures and improve the overall quality of play, the 2006 edition saw a significant number of players depart for Europe and elsewhere.

External links
 CBF Confederação Brasileira de Futebol - Brazilian Football Confederation
 RSSSF Brazil links
 Placar magazine online

1
2005